Charles Aznavour Square is a large square at the northern part of Gyumri city, Armenia. It is considered the 3rd square of the city after the Vardanants Square and the Independence Square. 

The square is intersected by the following streets:
 Vazgen Sargsyan street from the northwest.
 Missak Manouchian street from the northeast.
 Khanjyan street from the east.
 Garegin Nzhdeh street from the south.
 Ilya Repin street from the west.

The rectangular-shaped square (115 by 80 meters) was restored in 2000 and the statue of the renowned French-Armenian singer Charles Aznavour was erected. The sculptor of the statue was Samvel Petrosyan.

The square is surrounded with many commercial and residential buildings.

See also
 Charles Aznavour Square, Yerevan

References
 

Buildings and structures in Gyumri
Squares in Gyumri